The Will Eisner Comic Industry Awards, commonly shortened to the Eisner Awards, are prizes given for creative achievement in American comic books, referred to as the comics industry's equivalent to the Academy Awards. The awards are regarded by many as the most prestigious, significant awards in the comics industry. They are named in honor of the pioneering writer and artist Will Eisner, who was a regular participant in the award ceremony until his death in 2005. The Eisner Awards include the Comic Industry's Hall of Fame.

The nominations in each category are generated by a five- to a six-member jury, then voted on by comic book professionals and presented at the annual San Diego Comic-Con held in July, usually on Friday night. The jury often consists of at least one comics retailer, one librarian (since 2005), and one academic researcher, among other comics experts.

History 
The Eisner Awards and Harvey Awards were first conferred in 1988, both created in response to the discontinuation of the Kirby Awards in 1987. Dave Olbrich started the non-profit organization.

There was no Eisner Award ceremony, or awards distributed, in 1990, due to widespread balloting mix-ups. The previous administrator, Dave Olbrich, left the position, and Jackie Estrada has been the award administrator since 1990. The Eisner Award ceremony has been held at the San Diego Comic-Con every year since 1991.

In 2006, it was announced that the archives of the Eisner Awards would be housed at the James Branch Cabell Library of Virginia Commonwealth University in Richmond.

Categories
The Eisner Awards are awarded in the following categories:

Current
, awards are presented in 32 categories for works published in 2020.

Best Short Story (1993–present)
Best Single Issue/One-Shot (1988–2008, 2010–present)
Best Continuing Series (1988–present)
Best Limited Series (1988–present)
Best New Series (1988–present)
Best Publication for Early Readers (2012–present)
Best Publication for Kids (2008–present)
Best Publication for Teens (2008–present)
Best Humor Publication (1992–present)
Best Anthology (1992–present)
Best Reality-Based Work (2006–present)
Best Graphic Memoir (2021–present)
Best Graphic Album — New (1991–present)
Best Graphic Album — Reprint (1991–present)
Best Adaptation from Another Medium (2013–2014, 2016, 2018–present)
Best U.S. Edition of International Material (1998–present)
Best U.S. Edition of International Material—Asia (2010–present)
Best Archival Collection/Project — Strips (1992–1993, 2006–present)
Best Archival Collection/Project — Comic Books (2006–present)
Best Writer (1988–present)
Best Writer/Artist (1988–present)
Best Penciller/Inker or Penciller/Inker Team (1994–present)
Best Painter/Digital Artist (1993–2011, 2013–present)
Best Cover Artist (for multiple covers) (1992–present)
Best Coloring (1992–present)
Best Lettering (1993–present)
Best Comics-Related Periodical/Journalism (2008–present)
Best Comics-Related Book (1992–present)
Best Academic/Scholarly Work (2012–present)
Best Publication Design (1993–present)
Best Digital Comic (2005–present)
Best Webcomic (2017–present)

Past awards
Best Graphic Album (1988–1989)
Best Art Team (1988–1989)
Best Black-and-White Series (1988–1991)
Best Editor (1992–1997)
Best Comics-Related Product/Item (1992, 1994–2002)
Best Comics-Related Periodical/Publication (1992–2000, 2002–2007)
Best Archival Collection/Project (1993–2005)
Best Serialized Story (1993–2006)
Talent Deserving of Wider Recognition (1995–2006)
Best Writer/Artist — Humor (1995–2008)
Best Title for Younger Readers/Best Comics Publication for a Younger Audience (1996–2007)
Best Writer/Artist — Drama (1997–2008)
Best Comics-Related Sculpted Figures (1999)
Best Comics-Related Publication (Periodical or Book) (2003)
Best U.S. Edition of International Material–Japan (2007–2009)
Special Recognition (2007–2008)
Best Writer/Artist–Nonfiction (2010)
Best Adaptation from Another Work (2010–2011)

Past winners

See also
Other comic-related awards given at the San Diego Comic Con:
Inkpot Award
Russ Manning Promising Newcomer Award (1982–present)
Kirby Award (1985–1987)
The Bill Finger Award For Excellence In Comic Book Writing (2005–present)

Other comics-related awards:
Alley Award
Eagle Award
GLAAD Media Award for Outstanding Comic Book
Harvey Award
Ignatz Award
National Comics Award
Ringo Award
Shazam Award

References

External links
Eisner Awards from 1988 - 2007. WebCitation archive.
Archive of 2005 Eisner awards from Comic-Con.org. WebCitation archive. Original page.
2006 Eisner Award winners, Comic-Con.org. WebCitation archive.
2007 Eisner Award winners, Comic-Con.org. WebCitation archive.
2008 Eisner Award winners, Comic-Con.org. WebCitation archive.
2009 Eisner Award winners, Comic-Con.org. WebCitation archive.
1985-1989 Eisner Award winners, Comic-Con International San Diego. Archived from the original on July 3, 2013.
1991-1999 Eisner Award winners, Comic-Con International San Diego. Archived from the original on February 1, 2014
2000-2009 Eisner Award winners, Comic-Con International San Diego. Archived from the original on February 1, 2015.
2010-2020 Eisner Award winners, Comic-Con International San Diego. Archived from the original on October 30, 2020.

 
1988 establishments in the United States
Annual events in the United States
Awards established in 1988